Rodolfo Alejandro Suarez (born 20 April 1963) is an Argentine Radical Civic Union politician who is currently serving as governor of Mendoza Province, since 10 December 2019. Previously, from 2014 to 2019, he was intendente (mayor) of the City of Mendoza, having assumed office following the death of then-mayor Víctor Fayad.

Suarez wanted to reform the Constitution, which has not been updated for more than 100 years. He proposed to update rights, establish unicamerality, increase territorial representation, reduce political spending and leave out the possibility of reelection of the governor. The Justicialist Party opposed it.

Early life and education
Rodolfo Alejandro Suarez was born on 20 April 1963 in the rural town of La Consulta, in the San Carlos Department of Mendoza Province, the youngest of four siblings. Suárez comes from a political family: both of his grandfathers served as mayors of San Carlos; Ricardo Reynoso for the Justicialist Party (PJ) and Ulpiano Suárez for the Radical Civic Union (UCR). Rodolfo's father, Ulpiano, served as president of the provincial Chamber of Deputies. His nephew, also named Ulpiano after his father and grandfather, succeeded him as mayor of Mendoza in 2019.

Suárez moved to Mendoza in 1981 to study law at the University of Mendoza, later finishing his studies at the National University of Córdoba, where he earned his licenciatura in 1991.

Political career
Suárez joined the Radical Civic Union in the 1980s. He held a number of low-profile advisoral positions in the provincial legislature and the City of Mendoza throughout the 1990s before being elected to the Mendoza City Council in 2009.

Throughout his career he maintained a close friendship with Víctor Fayad, who was twice mayor of Mendoza; Suárez has stated that he considered Fayad to be his "mentor" and "political godfather"; it was Fayad who suggested Suárez run for a seat in the City Council. He was sworn in on 21 April 2010. A year later, Suárez was elected president of the city council. 

Upon Fayad's death due to cancer on 7 August 2014, Suárez succeeded him as mayor of Mendoza. He ran for the position the next year and won with 59.99% of the vote.

Governor of Mendoza
Ahead of the 2019 general election, Suárez was nominated by the ruling UCR to be the Cambiemos Mendoza gubernatorial candidate. He won the election with 51% against Frente de Todos candidate Anabel Fernández Sagasti's 36%. He took office on 10 December 2019.

On 20 December 2019 the provincial legislature passed – with Suárez's blessing – a resolution modifying Law 7722 on mining regulations; the new modified law allowed for the use of cyanide and sulfuric acid in surface mining, which could have had negative impact on the province's already limited water resources. The initiative stirred controversy and was widely protested by locals and environmentalist groups. The law was overturned on 30 December 2019.

Personal life
Suárez is married to Fabiana Calleja, a physics education teacher. He has four children: Gastón, Valentín, Sofía and Facundo.

References

External links

Official website of the Governorship of Mendoza (in Spanish)

1963 births
Living people
People from Mendoza Province
Mayors of Mendoza, Argentina
Governors of Mendoza Province
Radical Civic Union politicians
21st-century Argentine politicians